Chalcedonian Christianity is a term referring to the branches of Christianity that accept and uphold theological resolutions of the Council of Chalcedon, the Fourth Ecumenical Council, held in 451. Chalcedonian Christianity accepts the Christological Definition of Chalcedon, a Christian doctrine concerning the union of two natures (divine and human) in one hypostasis of Jesus Christ, who is thus acknowledged as a single person (prosopon). Chalcedonian Christianity also accepts the Chalcedonian confirmation of the Niceno-Constantinopolitan Creed, thus acknowledging the commitment of Chalcedonism to Nicene Christianity.

Chalcedonian Christology

Those present at the Council of Chalcedon accepted Trinitarianism and the concept of hypostatic union, and rejected Arianism, Modalism, and Ebionism as heresies (which had also been rejected at the First Council of Nicaea in AD 325). Those present at the council also rejected the Christological doctrines of the Nestorians, Eutychians, and Monophysites (these doctrines had also been rejected at the First Council of Ephesus in 431).

The Chalcedonian doctrine of the Hypostatic Union states that Jesus Christ has two natures, divine and human, possessing a complete human nature while remaining one divine hypostasis. It asserts that the natures are unmixed and unconfused, with the human nature of Christ being assumed at the incarnation without any change to the divine nature. It also states that while Jesus Christ has assumed a true human nature, body and soul, which shall remain hypostatically united to his divine nature for all of eternity, he is nevertheless not a human person, as human personhood would imply a second created hypostasis existing within Jesus Christ and violating the unity of the God-man.

The Hypostatic Union was also viewed as one nature in Roman Christianity around this time. Single-nature ideas such as Apollinarism and Eutychianism were taught to explain some of the seeming contradictions in Chalcedonian Christianity.

References

Sources 

 
 
 
 
 
 
 
 
 
 
 
 
 
 
 

Christian terminology
Trinitarianism
Christian theological movements
Nature of Jesus Christ